Celynen North Halt railway station served the town of Abercarn, in the historical county of Glamorganshire, from 1936 to 1962 on the Monmouthshire Railway.

History 
The station was opened on 10 August 1936 by the Great Western Railway. It didn't appear in the timetable as it was only open to the miners of the nearby Celynen Colliery. It closed on 30 April 1962.

References 

Former Great Western Railway stations
Railway stations in Great Britain opened in 1936
Railway stations in Great Britain closed in 1962
1936 establishments in Wales
1962 disestablishments in Wales